Susan Gourvenec  is a British geoscientist who is Professor of Offshore Geotechnical Engineering and deputy director of the Southampton Marine and Maritime Institute at the University of Southampton. She was elected a Fellow of the Royal Academy of Engineering in 2022.

Early life and education 
Gourvenec studied engineering at Queen Mary and Westfield, which is now part of Queen Mary University of London. She moved to the University of Southampton for research studies. Her doctoral research considered geotechnical engineering, and the development of 3D finite element limit analysis of wall installation. She was a postdoctoral research fellow at the University of Cambridge, where she spent two years before going to Perth. In Australia, Gourvenec worked at Advanced Geomechanics Pty, where she was a member of the Centre for Offshore Foundation Systems.

Research and career 
Gourvenec develops new technologies to understand ocean structures, including the seabed. These technologies include robotics, sensors and autonomous vehicles. She moved to the University of Southampton in 2017, and was named a Royal Academy of Engineering Chair in Emerging Technologies. She was elected Fellow of the Royal Academy of Engineering in 2022.

Selected publications

References 

British geophysicists
Living people
Year of birth missing (living people)
Fellows of the Royal Academy of Engineering
Female Fellows of the Royal Academy of Engineering
Alumni of the University of Southampton